The Department of Archaeology is a non-ministerial government department in Sri Lanka responsible for managing the archaeological heritage.

History
In 1868, seven years after the establishment of the Archaeological Survey of India, Governor Sir Hercules Robinson appointed the Committee on Ancient Architecture in Ceylon, to obtain information regarding the ancient architectural works of Ceylon. 

In 1871 Joseph Lawton was commissioned by the Committee to photograph the principal structures and ruins at Anuradhapura, Mihintale, Polonnaruwa and Sigirya. His photographs are used extensively in Smither's publication, Architectural Remains Anuradhapura, Ceylon: the Dugabas and Certain Other Ancient Ruined Structures.

Between 1873 and 1875, under the direction of  Governor Sir William Gregory, a complete site survey of structural remains at Anuradhapura was undertaken. The work was carried out by James George Smither, the principal architect at the Public Works Department, who subsequently published in 1894, Architectural Remains Anuradhapura, Ceylon: the Dugabas and Certain Other Ancient Ruined Structures, which comprised information on Anuradhapura's stupas and other ancient ruined structures. 

Between 1875 and 1879 Dr Paul Goldschmidt, a philologist and the pioneer of Sinhalese epigraphy, carried out a search of ancient inscriptions and original records. This work was continued by Dr. Edwin Muller and Maha Mudaliyar Louis W. de Zoysa. 

Between 1884 and 1886, Stephen Montagu Burrows, the Assistant Government Agent in the North Central Province, was assigned the responsibility of supervising the archaeological works at Anuradhapura and Polonnaruwa. He published a book, The Buried Cities of Ceylon in 1885.

On 7 July 1890 Governor Sir Arthur Gordon, appointed Harry Charles Purvis Bell as the first Archaeological Commissioner and Head of the Archaeological Survey of Ceylon. The Survey consisted of the Commissioner, a European assistant commissioner, a native assistant, a clerk, and three draughtsmen. The first task given to the Survey was the exploration, excavation, mapping and conservation of historical monuments at Anuradhapura. In 1895 the Survey commenced work at Sigiriya and in May 1900 at Polonnaruwa. Between 1902 and 1907 John Still (the author of Jungle Tide) served as assistant commissioner.

On 8 December 1912 Edward Russell Ayrton was appointed Archaeological Commissioner, having previously worked as the assistant commissioner under Bell. On 18 May 1914 Ayrton drowned at Tissa Wewa in Tissamaharama. The Archaeological Department all but closed down, with only a skeleton staff, during World War I, with a series of acting heads. It wasn't until the appointment of Arthur Maurice Hocart in 1921 that the Department became more active. Hocart recognised the need to train young Ceylonese to work in the department, and amongst his protégées was Senarath Paranavithana, who was sent in 1923 to Ootacamund to train under the Government Epigraphist in India. In 1925 Hocart took a year's leave and returned to England. In his absence M. Wedderburn acted as Archaeology Commissioner. Upon his return in 1926 Hocart appointed Paranavithana as the Epigraphical assistant. When Hocart retired in 1929 C. F. Windsor took the role of Commissioner and at this time the head office of the Archaeological Department was relocated from Anuradhapura to Colombo.

In 1932 when Windsor retired Senarath Paranavithana became the first Sri Lankan to be appointed as head of the Department. In 1935 Albert Henry Longhurst took over the role of Archaeological Commissioner and Paranavithana was his Epigraphical assistant. Longhurst was previously the Superintendent of the Archaeological Survey of India. During his tenure in Ceylon he concentrated on the conservation of monuments, particularly in Polonnaruwa. With commencement of World War II all the major works of the department were suspended and Dr Paranavithana was appointed Commissioner. After the country gained its independence the Archaeological Department went through a significant phase of expansion, with its activities expanded to almost every district on the island.

When Paranavithana retired in 1956 the position of Commissioner was taken by Charles Godakumbura, a role which he occupied until his retirement in 1967. Raja H. de Silva was then appointed the new Commissioner.

The current head of the Department, Anura Manatunga, was appointed to the position on 1 January 2020, following the retirement of Senarath Dissanayake in 2017.

Archaeological Commissioner

See also
 List of museums in Sri Lanka

References

External links
  

Archaeology
Archaeology of Sri Lanka
Sri Lanka, Archaeology, Department
Antiquities ministries